Paurophylla is a genus of moths of the family Erebidae. The genus was described by Turner in 1902.

Species
Paurophylla aleuropasta Turner, 1902 Queensland
Paurophylla bidentata (Wileman, 1915) Formosa
Paurophylla prominens (Hampson, 1895) Sikkim

References

Hypeninae
Moth genera